Mickaël Marvin Soriano Piétrus (born February 7, 1982) is a French former professional basketball player. Listed at 6'6", 215 pounds, he played both the small forward and shooting guard positions. Piétrus was drafted by the Golden State Warriors with the 11th pick of the 2003 NBA draft, and is originally from Guadeloupe, a Caribbean island that is a part of France.

Piétrus is also known by the nicknames MP, Air France, Euro Jordan and Puma. He speaks French, English, and Antillean Creole fluently.

Professional career

Pau-Orthez
With ÉB Pau-Orthez, Piétrus won the French League championship, in 2001 and 2003, as well as the French National Cup, in 2002 and 2003.

Golden State Warriors

After leaving his native France, Piétrus was drafted by the Golden State Warriors. He played there for five seasons with the last being the 07–08 season.

Orlando Magic
During the 2008 off-season, Piétrus was signed by the Orlando Magic.

In Piétrus's debut, he scored 20 points against the Atlanta Hawks. He continued to be a key player for the Orlando Magic, with one of his best games being against the Dallas Mavericks, where he made 5 three-point field goals to lead the Magic into a comeback and their first win in Dallas.

Piétrus helped the Magic throughout the 2009 NBA Playoffs where the team reached its second Finals appearance and was a successful defender against LeBron James. However, he struggled during the final series against the Los Angeles Lakers, as Kobe Bryant proved too much for him to handle as Orlando fell short in five games.

Phoenix Suns
On December 18, 2010, Piétrus was traded to the Phoenix Suns along with Vince Carter, Marcin Gortat, a 2011 first-round draft pick, and $3 million, for former Magic player Hedo Türkoğlu, Jason Richardson, and Earl Clark. On December 9, 2011, the Suns tried to trade Piétrus and $1 Million to the Toronto Raptors in exchange for a conditional second round draft pick. One day later, Toronto decided to suspend the trade because Piétrus had a problem with his right knee and it would take 2–4 weeks for it to heal. Piétrus was waived by the Suns on December 22, 2011.

Boston Celtics
Piétrus signed a $1.3 million deal with the Boston Celtics on December 24, 2011, two days after Phoenix waived him.
 
On March 23, 2012, Piétrus fell on the floor of the Wells Fargo Center, after being blocked on a layup. He was taken off by stretcher and was diagnosed with a grade three concussion, and ruled out until at least the playoffs. He had been averaging 6.8 points, 2.9 rebounds, and 0.7 assists per game, with the Celtics.  He returned in a game against the Atlanta Hawks on April 11, 2012.

Toronto Raptors
On November 30, 2012, Piétrus signed with the Toronto Raptors. His final NBA game ever was played on March 20th, 2013 in a 101 - 107 loss to the Charlotte Bobcats where he recorded 2 rebounds and 3 fouls.

Puerto Rico
On March 4, 2015, Piétrus signed with Mets de Guaynabo of Puerto Rico. On May 11, 2015, he was replaced in the line-up by Cedric Jackson.

SLUC Nancy Basket
On November 25, 2015, Piétrus signed with the French club SLUC Nancy Basket.

National team career
In September 2005, Piétrus  won the bronze medal at the EuroBasket 2005, with the senior French national team. He also played at the 2006 FIBA World Championship.

Personal life
Piétrus' older brother, Florent, is also a professional basketball player. 

Piétrus resides in Orlando, Florida. He spends his free time DJing at nightclubs.

NBA career statistics

Regular season 

|-
| style="text-align:left;"| 
| style="text-align:left;"| Golden State
| 53 || 22 || 14.1 || .416 || .333 || .693 || 2.2 || .5 || .6 || .2 || 5.3
|-
| style="text-align:left;"| 
| style="text-align:left;"| Golden State
| 67 || 3 || 20.0 || .427 || .344 || .698 || 2.8 || 1.2 || .7 || .3 || 9.5
|-
| style="text-align:left;"| 
| style="text-align:left;"| Golden State
| 52 || 18 || 22.7 || .404 || .318 || .608 || 3.1 || .8 || .6 || .2 || 9.3
|-
| style="text-align:left;"| 
| style="text-align:left;"| Golden State
| 72 || 38 || 26.9 || .488 || .388 || .648 || 4.5 || .9 || .7 || .8 || 11.1
|-
| style="text-align:left;"| 
| style="text-align:left;"| Golden State
| 66 || 16 || 19.9 || .439 || .361 || .673 || 3.7 || .7 || 1.0 || .7 || 7.2
|-
| style="text-align:left;"| 
| style="text-align:left;"| Orlando
| 54 || 25 || 24.6 || .413 || .359 || .709 || 3.3 || 1.2 || .6 || .4 || 9.4
|-
| style="text-align:left;"| 
| style="text-align:left;"| Orlando
| 75 || 24 || 22.5 || .432 || .379 || .633 || 2.9 || .7 || .7 || .4 || 8.7
|-
| style="text-align:left;"| 
| style="text-align:left;"| Orlando
| 19 || 0 || 22.0 || .391 || .391 || .500 || 2.6 || .5 || .5 || .2 || 6.7
|-
| style="text-align:left;"| 
| style="text-align:left;"| Phoenix
| 38 || 4 || 18.1 || .392 || .342 || .706 || 2.0 || .6 || .5 || .5 || 7.4
|-
| style="text-align:left;"| 
| style="text-align:left;"| Boston
| 42 || 6 || 21.9 || .385 || .335 || .645 || 3.1 || .6 || .5 || .2 || 6.9
|-
| style="text-align:left;"| 
| style="text-align:left;"| Toronto
| 19 || 16 || 20.3 || .347 || .313 || .667 || 1.9 || .5 || .6 || .3 || 5.3
|- class="sortbottom"
| style="text-align:center;" colspan="2"| Career
| 557 || 172 || 21.5 || .425 || .355 || .665 || 3.1 || .8 || .7 || .4 || 8.3

Playoffs 

|-
| style="text-align:left;"| 2007
| style="text-align:left;"| Golden State
| 11 || 0 || 19.0 || .347 || .259 || .694 || 3.8 || .5 || .5 || .8 || 6.0
|-
| style="text-align:left;"| 2009
| style="text-align:left;"| Orlando
| 24 || 0 || 25.8 || .483 || .385 || .723 || 2.6 || .6 || .8 || .5 || 10.5
|-
| style="text-align:left;"| 2010
| style="text-align:left;"| Orlando
| 14 || 0 || 20.1 || .438 || .459 || .667 || 1.4 || .7 || .6 || .4 || 8.4
|-
| style="text-align:left;"| 2012
| style="text-align:left;"| Boston
| 20 || 1 || 19.6 || .329 || .222 || .563 || 2.0 || .1 || .7 || .3 || 3.5
|- class="sortbottom"
| style="text-align:center;" colspan="2"| Career
| 69 || 1 || 21.8 || .426 || .353 || .687 || 2.4 || .5 || .7 || .5 || 7.3

See also 
 
 List of French NBA players
 List of European basketball players in the United States

References

External links 

NBA.com profile

Official Website
NBA.com: Prospect Profile: Mickael Pietrus

1982 births
Living people
2006 FIBA World Championship players
Black French sportspeople
Boston Celtics players
Élan Béarnais players
French expatriate basketball people in Canada
French expatriate basketball people in the United States
French men's basketball players
French people of Guadeloupean descent
Golden State Warriors draft picks
Golden State Warriors players
Guadeloupean men's basketball players
National Basketball Association players from France
Orlando Magic players
People from Les Abymes
Phoenix Suns players
Shooting guards
Small forwards
Toronto Raptors players